Sex o no sex is a 1974 Spanish comedy film directed and written by Julio Diamante. It is composed by Carmelo A. Bernaola and it is starred by Don Jaime de Mora y Aragón, Antonio Ferrandis and José Sacristán. It was the penultimate film directed by Julio Diamante and the third one whose cast is composed by José Sacristán and Carmen Sevilla.

Cast
 Carmen Sevilla as Angélica
 José Sacristán as Paco Jiménez 'Don Paco'
 Antonio Ferrandis as Director
 José Vivó as Psicoanalista
 Ágata Lis as Chica sexy
 Lola Gaos as Tía de Angélica
 Carmen Martínez Sierra as Dama solitaria y confiada
 Sergio Mendizábal
 Margarita Calahorra
 Montserrat Julió
 Sandra Dos Santos as Chica sexy en el tren (as Xandra Dos Santos)
 Pedro Mounier
 Don Jaime de Mora y Aragón as Tomás 'el muestras'

References

External links
 

Spanish comedy films
Films directed by Julio Diamante
Films scored by Carmelo Bernaola
1974 comedy films
1974 films